There are many classes of roads in Canada. The only inter-provincial systems are the Trans-Canada Highway and National Highway System.

Provincial & territorial highways

List of Alberta provincial highways
List of British Columbia provincial highways
List of Manitoba provincial highways
List of New Brunswick provincial highways
List of Newfoundland and Labrador provincial highways
List of Northwest Territories highways

List of Nova Scotia provincial highways
List of Ontario provincial highways
List of Prince Edward Island provincial highways
List of Quebec provincial highways
List of Saskatchewan provincial highways
List of Yukon territorial highways

County and regional roads
County roads in Ontario

City streets by province

Alberta

British Columbia

Manitoba

Nova Scotia

Ontario

Quebec

Saskatchewan

References

See also 

 Highways in Nunavut
 Transport in Canada